ABQ RIDE (City of Albuquerque Transit Department) is the local transit agency serving Albuquerque, New Mexico. ABQ RIDE operates a variety of city bus routes including two Albuquerque Rapid Transit (ART) bus rapid transit lines and one ARTx express bus line.

The name "ABQ RIDE" and a new logo depicting the Alvarado Transportation Center clock tower were chosen in a contest, replacing the previous name SunTran in September 2004. The current ABQ RIDE color scheme is yellow-green, white, and turquoise, though most of the existing fleet wears the previous maroon, white, and gold livery.

History 
What is now ABQ RIDE began in 1928 as the Albuquerque Bus Company. Before this, transit in the city was provided by an electric streetcar system, but it was forced out of business by declining ridership and expensive paving bills charged by the city government. City leader Clyde Tingley was a strong opponent of the streetcar system and led the effort to have it replaced with buses. The streetcar stopped running at midnight on December 31, 1927, and the bus company began operation the next morning. The company started with five White Motor Company buses and had four routes: Central Avenue, Fourth Street, Sawmill-Edith Street, and East Silver Avenue. ABQ RIDE still owns one of the original buses and uses it for special occasions.

But the company was not able to maintain profitability as private car ownership increased in the 1950s and 1960s, and in 1963, the Albuquerque Bus Company notified the city it planned to cease operation within a few months. In order to maintain service for bus riders, the city ultimately bought out the assets of the bus company and turned it into the city Transit Department. The official handover took place on February 1, 1965, with the city retaining all existing routes and equipment and most of the personnel.

The bus system operated under the name Albuquerque Transit System, and then Sun Tran starting in the 1970s. It adopted the current name, ABQ RIDE, in 2004, the same year the first Rapid Ride route began operating. In 2019, two of the three Rapid Ride routes were replaced with the Albuquerque Rapid Transit (ART) bus rapid transit system. The remaining Rapid Ride route was rebranded as ARTx in 2020.

In January 2022, ABQ RIDE launched a pilot program, eliminating fares on all of the agency's transit services for the year. The program, supported by a federal grant, was later extended to June 2023.

Service 

The ABQ RIDE system includes regular service routes on most of the city's major streets as well as commuter routes that ferry workers between residential areas and the city center. Many routes terminate at the Alvarado Transportation Center downtown, where riders can connect to the New Mexico Rail Runner Express and other intercity modes of transportation. ABQ RIDE also operates the Rapid Ride and ART services.

ABQ RIDE fixed bus service operates four types of routes: Rapid Ride, regular, commuter, and BRT. Service times on each route may vary from every 15 minutes to every hour, but the system generally runs from 5:30 am until 6 pm, with some routes running later. A notable exception is route #66 which runs from 5:30 am until 12:30 am weekdays and Saturdays. Commuter routes only have a few run times during weekdays, usually towards Downtown Albuquerque or Kirtland AFB during the mornings and away from during the evenings. D-Ride service ended on May 12, 2018, and was replaced by various local routes, such as 12th Street/Rio Grande (routes #36 and #37) and Menaul (route #8). All inbound routes to the Alvarado Transportation Center, except route #66 and Rapid Ride routes, have a fare-free zone.

Routes 96, 155, 222, 250, 251, 551, and 790 are either partially or fully funded by the Mid-Region Council of Governments (MRCOG), and either service areas outside of Albuquerque's city limits, create connections to its Rail Runner Express stations, or supplement service on the expanding west side. Routes 10, 51, 53, and 54 are either partially or fully funded by Bernalillo County, since these routes largely serve the county's unincorporated areas.

In addition to its fixed route services, ABQ RIDE also operates a paratransit service called SunVan (known as Mini Ride from 2003–2006) that runs curb-to-curb service.

Routes 

ABQ RIDE operates 22 regular fixed routes, 15 commuter routes, 2 Bus Rapid Transit, and 1 Rapid Ride routes.

Former Routes 
3 Louisiana (replaced by Route 157; service on Louisiana, north of Montgomery discontinued due to low ridership)
4 San Mateo (replaced by 140/141 San Mateo)
9 Coors/Gibson
14 Airport/UNM Loop
15
17 Rio Grande
18 Broadway/University/Gibson (replaced by Route 16)
21 Old Town Trolley (formerly the 25)
21/22 Nob Hill / Biopark
23 Nob Hill Express
24 Sun Trolley
25 Copper/Chico Sundial
26 Los Volcanes Circulator
27 Montaño & Coors
32
33 Uptown/Central
35
37 12th Street
40 D-RIDE/Free Downtown Shuttle (replaced by fare free zones on most inbound routes to Alvarado Transportation Center on May 12, 2018)
52 Sunset/South Coors
55 Southwest Heights
90 Coors (replaced by 155/158 Coors)
91 Ventura Commuter
95 Montaño/Jefferson Commuter
156 West Side Rapid Ride (Coors) (upgraded and changed to 790 Rapid Ride Blue Line)
158 Coors/Golf Course (Replaced by New Route 157)
163 Taylor Ranch Commuter
456 West Mesa Shuttle
766 R.A.D. Rapid After Dark (Red Line Only)

Fares 
Fares are currently suspended, and all ABQ RIDE services are free to ride until June 30, 2023.

1Requires valid school ID.  2Requires picture ID or Medicare card.  3Must be accompanied by parent or guardian; limit 3 per fare-paying rider.  4Class schedule must be shown to obtain sticker for CNM students.  ABQ RIDE sticker valid for current school year. 5Veterans who are enrolled in the VA health care system, and who have a VIC (Veterans Identification Card) or newly issued VHIC (Veterans Hospital Identification Card), are eligible to receive the sticker.

The fare for ABQ RIDE's paratransit service is $2 One-Way, with 10 paratransit fares for $18.

As of August 13, 2007, all bus routes are now free for University of New Mexico students, faculty, and staff via a sticker on their ID. In October 2007, free ridership was extended to Central New Mexico Community College students as well. In August 2013, UNM Hospital Employees also gained access to the ABQ RIDE sticker program. ABQ RIDE started offering stickers to veterans in the VA health care system on April 21, 2014.

Fleet

Current fleet 

All buses feature TwinVision LED destination signs.  The front destination signs on the New Flyer buses are able to display route numbers in different colors (as the Rapid Ride buses do for the three Rapid Ride routes, the Red Line, Blue Line, and Green Line).  All other signs, including the front destination signs on all 300 and 400 series buses, display in orange only.  The 300 series buses formerly featured flip-dot destination signs, however, they were retrofitted with the orange TwinVision LED signs in 2004 alongside the automated voice annunciator system. ABQ RIDE did not order the color LED destination signs for the 600 series buses, citing ongoing reliability issues, opting instead to go with orange LED signs.

All buses are also all equipped with a Clever Devices automated voice annunciator system, which announces the major intersections (or on the Rapid Ride buses, the stops).  The system was first introduced in 2001 on the 400 series buses.  The 300 series buses were retrofitted with the system in 2004 (alongside the TwinVision LED destination signs), and all deliveries since then has had the system factory-installed.

On October 4, 2010, the Federal Transit Administration approved a $3 million grant request from ABQ RIDE to provide money for bus replacement. On February 7, 2014, ABQ RIDE placed an order for 21 New Flyer Xcelsior XN40 CNG Buses, with deliveries starting in the middle of March. 17 of these buses will replace 17 of the 300 series buses, while the remaining 4 have been used to replace the last of the 400 series buses. 300 Series now operate the routes the 400 Series once did.

In January 2015, bus 617 and bus 747 were involved in separate accidents, resulting in the complete write-off of 747. 617 was repaired at the Yale Transit Yard, and returned to active service in early 2016. No one was seriously harmed in either accident, and both accidents were caused by other vehicles failing to stop at a red light.

The 600-series buses purchased in 2015 (622-641) all have open WiFi networks available for public use. In addition, they have a screen installed behind the driver that displays the current security camera feed from the camera looking down the aisle from the front of the bus.

Retired fleet (since 1965)

Other vehicles 

In addition, the fleet comprises numerous smaller vehicles like the SunVan paratransit vans, and formerly, the Old Town trolley. CNG buses (300- and 600-series buses) and the 900-series buses operate out of the Yale Transit Department on 601 Yale Blvd. SE, while the 700-series buses, Rapid Ride buses (6400-series, 6600-series, and 6900-series), and the paratransit fleet operate out of the Daytona Transit Facility on Daytona Rd near Unser Blvd. and I-40. Daytona operates seven days a week except on city-observed holidays. Yale operates on weekdays only. On May 1, 2015, the 900-series buses were moved temporarily to Daytona due to renovations at Yale; however, they went back to operating out of the Yale facility beginning October 19, 2015. The Yale Transit Department is now equipped with unleaded fuel to fuel shuttle cars.

Plans

Bus rapid transit service along Central 

In November 2011, ABQ RIDE announced plans for true bus rapid transit service along Central Avenue.  The service differs from the Rapid Ride based on the fact that it would be considered a true BRT service based on adding more aspects of BRT service such as a dedicated travel lane or queue jumps, platforms level with the bus floor, and off-board ticketing so that passengers can load at any door.

On March 24, 2014, ABQ RIDE demonstrated a New Flyer XN60, which was built for RTC in Las Vegas, NV, and was en route for delivery. This type of bus is one of the designs being explored for BRT service, and is the longer 60 foot version of the current XN40 buses being delivered to ABQ RIDE.

On May 15, 2014, ABQ RIDE introduced a new logo and paint scheme for the organization.

In October 2014, the City of Albuquerque unveiled conceptual designs for construction of Albuquerque Rapid Transit, a true BRT system including dedicated lanes, traffic signal priority, level boarding, and off-bus fare payment. Public input from meetings will allow engineering of the BRT system and redesign of the roads it will travel on.

Following delays from equipment problems, BRT service started in November 2019.

Uptown Transit Center 

In October 2014, ABQ Ride also revealed plans for a transit-oriented development (TOD) on the site of the Uptown Transit Center. The land for the transit center was originally purchased with a grant from the FTA with the intent of someday building a TOD on the site. The plans call for a parking garage above the island where buses stop and will continue to stop, a building with retail on the ground floor and several levels of living units above that, and the possibility of a multi-generational center above the parking garage. These plans were created with the help of a public meeting earlier in 2014. ABQ Ride intends, with FTA approval, to enter into a partnership with a private developer for the actual construction and operation of the building.

Notes 

 ABQ RIDE PHOTO ALBUM

External links 

 
 Albuquerque Rapid Transit (Official BRT planning website)

Transportation in Albuquerque, New Mexico
Bus transportation in New Mexico
Bus rapid transit in New Mexico
Transit agencies in the United States
Transit authorities with natural gas buses
1928 establishments in New Mexico